BSDL may refer to:

 Bile salt dependent lipase
 Bitstream Syntax Description Language used in MPEG-B (ISO/IEC 23001-5)
 Boundary scan description language, a description language for electronics testing
 BSD licenses, a family of permissive free software licences